Sybilla Righton Masters (c. 1676 – 23 August 1720) was an American inventor. Masters was the first person residing in the American colonies to be given an English patent, and possibly the first known female Caucasian machinery inventor in America. Masters was given a patent for a corn mill in 1715 in her husband's name, as women were not allowed to have their own patents. She also patented a process for making hats.

Early life 
Not much is known of Masters' early life. It is possible that she was born in Bermuda as her father had emigrated from there in 1687. It is believed that she was born around 1676, and in 1687 she and her six sisters emigrated from Bermuda to Burlington Township, New Jersey (along the Delaware River) with her Quaker parents Sarah and William Righton. Sybilla Righton first showed up in the colonial records in 1692 when she testified as a witness for her father in the New Jersey courts. Sometime between 1693 and 1696, Sybilla married Thomas Masters a prosperous Quaker merchant and landowner. They had four children -Mary, Sarah, Thomas, and William.

Journey to London 
On June 24, 1712, Masters left her family and headed to London to pursue patents for her invention ideas. In 1712, some American colonies were issuing patents, but Pennsylvania was not among them. On November 25, 1715, the patent was granted by King George I of Great Britain in her husband's name for the process of "Cleaning and Curing The Indian Corn Growing in the several Colonies of America," shown right.

If not for her husband Thomas Masters, Sybilla Masters' name, as so many women inventors before and after her, would have been lost to history. Thomas Masters stated in the patent submission that it was her idea and when the patent was issued, King George I stated publicly that it was her idea. Masters received her second patent, again under her husband's name, for a method of weaving straw and palmetto leaves into hats and bonnets. She opened a shop in London that used this process and sold many popular hats and bonnets. Masters returned home to Pennsylvania on May 25, 1716.

Invention details
Masters' first patent was awarded for a new method of the curing and preparation of cornmeal used a stamping process instead of grinding. The machine consisted of a long wooden cylinder with projections on each side which caused a series of heavy pestles to drop onto mortars filled with corn kernels. This invention was powered by horses or water wheels. It produced a product Masters named, "Tuscarora Rice" which was falsely advertised and sold as a cure for tuberculosis. While the product did not catch on in England, it became a staple of the southeastern diet and is today known as grits.

The history of Masters and Tuscarora Rice was first described in 1844 by John Fanning Watson. Medical authorities have dismissed Tuscarora Rice as quackery.

Masters' second patent was awarded for a new process of making hats and bonnets using straw and palmetto leaves.  The process was used to create many other woven goods as well, such as baskets, matting and furniture coverings.

See also
Timeline of United States inventions (before 1890)

References

Bibliography
 Blashfield, Jean F. "Sybilla Masters America's First Patented Inventor." Women Inventors. Minneapolis: Capstone Press, 1996. 5-10. Print.
 "M." Notable American Women, 1607–1950: A Biographical Dictionary. Ed. Edward T. James. Vol. 2. The Belknap Press of Harvard University Cambridge, Massachusetts and London, 1971. 506–508. Print.
 Samuel, Charlie. "Sybilla Masters: The First Woman Inventor." Inventors and Inventions of Colonial America. 29 East 21st Street, New York: The Rosen Publishing Group, 2003. 13–14. Print.
Sarudy, Barbara Wells. "Quaker Inventor Sybilla Righton Masters (died in 1720) & Patents for Women." 18C American Women: 01 Jan. 1970. Web. 01 Oct. 2016.
 Waldrup, Carole C. "Sybilla Righton Masters (1675–1720)." More Colonial Women: 25 Pioneers of Early America. Jefferson, North Carolina, and London: McFarland & Company, 2004. 34–36. Print.

1720 deaths
18th-century American businesspeople
18th-century American scientists
18th-century American engineers
18th-century women engineers
18th-century American women scientists
18th-century American inventors
Maize production
People of colonial New Jersey
People from Burlington Township, New Jersey
Women inventors
Year of birth uncertain
Bermudian women
Bermudian people of European descent
Bermudian emigrants to the United States
18th-century American businesswomen
Inventors from New Jersey